John Fedevich (born in Massillon, Ohio) is an American drummer and actor known for his role in Almost Famous.

Career

John Fedevich acted in the movie Almost Famous playing the character of Ed Vallencourt, the Stillwater band drummer.  He later starred in Vanilla Sky (2001) and Shopgirl (2005). As a musician, Fedevich is a drummer for Michael Cavanaugh (a Billy Joel tribute artist).

Recently, he has performed with the Asia offshoot band Asia Featuring John Payne.

Personal life

Born and raised in Massillon, OH, Fedevich currently lives and works in Las Vegas, NV.

References

External links

Living people
American drummers
American male film actors
People from Massillon, Ohio
Musicians from Ohio
Year of birth missing (living people)